Bernardo Huberman is a Fellow and vice president of the Next-Gen Systems Team at CableLabs. He is also a Consulting Professor in the Department of Applied Physics and the Symbolic System Program at Stanford University. He received his Ph.D. in Physics from the University of Pennsylvania.

Early life and work 
Originally from Argentina, Huberman received his MS at the University of Buenos Aires, Argentina in 1966. He received his PhD in Physics from the University of Pennsylvania in 1971. He is the father of Neuroscientist Andrew Huberman. He has worked as a visiting scientist at the Institut Laue-Langevin in Grenoble, France and Institute of Theoretical Physics, Hebrew University of Jerusalem, Israel. He was also a Visiting Professor at the University of Paris, the École Normale Supérieure, in Paris, France, the Niels Bohr Institute in Copenhagen, Denmark, and the European School of Business, INSEAD in France. He served as a Trustee and Secretary at the Aspen Center for Physics between 1980–1983.

Huberman originally worked in condensed matter physics, ranging from superionic conductors to two-dimensional superfluids, and made contributions to the theory of critical phenomena in low-dimensional systems. He was one of the discoverers of chaos in a number of physical systems, and also established a number of universal properties in nonlinear dynamical systems. His research into the dynamics of complex structures led to the discovery of ultradiffusion in hierarchical systems.

Huberman joined Xerox Corporation's Palo Alto Research Center, PARC, where, in the field of information sciences, he predicted the existence of phase transitions in large scale distributed systems, and developed an economics approach to the solution of hard computational problems. He has authored or edited three books about the ecology of computation and the ecology of the web

.

In 1989 he and colleagues designed and implemented Spawn, a market system for the allocation of resources among machines in computer networks, and a few years later a multiagent thermal market mechanism for the control of building environments. A similar subsequent work at HP Labs called Tycoon received the Horizon Award for Innovation. After working at Xerox PARC, Huberman became a Senior Fellow at HP Labs.

Recent work and recognition 
For several years, Dr. Huberman's research concentrated on the World Wide Web, with particular emphasis the dynamics of its growth and use. With members of his group he discovered a number of strong regularities, such as the dynamics that govern the growth of the web, and the laws that determine how users surf the web and create the observed congestion patterns.

Recently, Huberman was the Director of the Mechanisms and Design Lab at Hewlett Packard Labs where his work centers on the design of novel mechanisms for discovering and aggregating information in distributed systems as well as understanding the dynamics of information in large networks.

Awards and honors 
 Fellow, American Association for the Advancement of Science
 Fellow, Japan Society for the Advancement of Science
 Fellow, American Physical Society
 CECOIA Prize on Economics and Artificial Intelligence
 IBM Prize of the Society for Computational Economics
 Trustee, Aspen Center for Physics
 Chairman, Council of Fellows at Xerox Corporation

References

External links
 Bernardo Huberman’s Patents
 Bernardo Huberman's bibliography
 Bernardo Huberman's homepage

Living people
Year of birth missing (living people)
Argentine emigrants to the United States
American computer scientists
Hewlett-Packard people
Stanford University Department of Applied Physics faculty
University of Buenos Aires alumni
University of Pennsylvania alumni
Scientists at PARC (company)